The 2018 Waltham Forest Council election was held on 3 May 2018 to elect members of Waltham Forest London Borough Council in England. This was on the same day as other local elections.

Election result

Results by ward

Cann Hall

Cathall

Chapel End

Chingford Green

Endlebury

Forest

Grove Green

Hale End & Highams Park

Hatch Lane

High Street

Higham Hill

Hoe Street

Larkswood

Lea Bridge

Leyton

Leytonstone

Markhouse

Valley

William Morris

Wood Street

By-elections

Grove Green

Lea Bridge

References

2018
2018 London Borough council elections